Lucius Julius Caesar (fl. 1st century BC) was a Roman politician and senator who was elected consul of the Roman Republic in 64 BC. A supporter of his cousin, the Roman dictator Gaius Julius Caesar, Lucius was a key member of the senatorial coalition which strove to avoid civil war between the Roman Senate and his nephew Marcus Antonius (Mark Antony) in the aftermath of Caesar's assassination in 44 BC.

Early career
A member of the patrician gens Julia, Lucius Julius Caesar was the son of the consul of 90 BC, also named Lucius Julius Caesar. He began his political career serving as Quaestor in the Roman Province of Asia in 77 BC, probably under Terentius Varro. By 69 BC Lucius had been elected to the priestly position of Augur, and by the end of 67 BC, he had served in the office of Praetor.

Lucius Caesar was then elected Roman consul for 64 BC, serving alongside Gaius Marcius Figulus. During his consulship, senatorial decrees were passed which limited the number of attendants who could accompany candidates during election campaigns, as well as making guilds and societies illegal. During the following year (63 BC), he, together with his cousin, the future Roman dictator Gaius Julius Caesar, was appointed to a two-man committee (Duumviri Perduellionis), for the purpose of bringing the senator Gaius Rabirius to trial for Perduellio.

Later that same year, in the aftermath of the Second Catilinarian Conspiracy, when the senate debated the forms of punishment for the Catalinarian conspirators, Lucius was among the former consuls who voted for the death penalty, although his own brother-in-law Publius Cornelius Lentulus (Sura) was among the accused. Following this, in 61 BC, Lucius Caesar was appointed to the censorship, probably serving with Caius Scribonius Curio Burbulieus.

Caesar's civil war 
In 52 BC, Lucius was serving as a legate under his cousin, Gaius Julius Caesar, who by this stage was in Gaul. As befitting his status as a former Consul, Lucius was placed in charge of Gallia Narbonensis; commanding 10,000 men, he was responsible for ensuring that the rebellion of Vercingetorix did not spread into Narbonese Gaul. After the suppression of the rebellion, he remained a legate through until 49 BC. Lucius Caesar was then caught up in the events of the civil war, as the Senate, under the influence of Marcus Porcius Cato, demanded that his cousin Gaius give up his armies and his Imperium when his proconsular command came to an end. Gaius refused and, taking his cousin Lucius with him, crossed the Rubicon. In the civil war which followed, Lucius supported Gaius in his fight against the senatorial faction known as the optimates. After the majority of the Senate fled Rome, Lucius remained in the capital while his cousin Gaius fought against the senatorial armies led by Gnaeus Pompeius Magnus.

During the next two years he remained in Rome, shoring up political support for Gaius, while he campaigned in Spain, and Greece. After the Battle of Pharsalus, Gaius was appointed Dictator, and he proceeded to transfer some of his veteran legions to Italy. However, the legions became mutinous, forcing Mark Antony, the Master of the Horse, to leave Rome to deal with them (47 BC). In an unprecedented procedure, Antonius appointed Lucius as Praefectus urbi, with orders to keep Rome secure while Antonius was absent. Lucius proved unable to prevent Rome from falling into turmoil.

Mutina campaign and efforts for peace 
Gaius Julius Caesar's assassination in 44 BC created an unstable atmosphere throughout the Roman Republic. Desperate to remain neutral as the disputes between the Caesarean faction and the Liberators worsened, Lucius Julius Caesar retired to Neapolis. This retirement was brief, as Lucius Caesar was back in Rome before the end of the year. 

He openly joined Marcus Tullius Cicero's senatorial faction, leading the Senate in repealing Antony's agrarian law. However, he did not utterly abandon his nephew, as he refused to allow for a state of civil war to be declared against Antony. More than anything else, he sought to avoid another civil war, and worked toward reconciling the various factions. Some time in the year, he was appointed princeps senatus after the title was revived. In early March of 43 BC, he was one of five ex-consuls appointed by the Senate to form a second delegation to Antony, seeking to arrange a truce between Mark Antony and Decimus Brutus Albinus. However, when two of the ex-consuls decided to withdraw from the delegation (Cicero and Publius Servilius Vatia Isauricus), the embassy was disbanded.

Later, after Antony had suffered a number of military setbacks, Lucius Caesar was one of the first to state that his nephew should be declared an enemy of the state. He was however to regret this when the Second Triumvirate was formed: as a consequence of his actions, Antony had him proscribed. Fleeing to his sister's (Antony's mother's) house, Lucius remained there until she obtained a pardon for him from her son. Lucius Caesar was still alive in 40 BC, when he was recorded as still being active as an augur.

Family
Lucius Julius Caesar had at least one son, also named Lucius. This son opposed his own father (Lucius) and uncle (Gaius) in the civil war. After the Battle of Thapsus in 46 BC, Lucius the younger was killed by the victorious soldiers.

References

Sources

 
 
 
 

2nd-century BC births
1st-century BC deaths
1st-century BC Roman augurs
1st-century BC Roman consuls
1st-century BC Roman praetors
Lucius consul 690 AUC
Roman censors
Year of birth unknown